Tyson Paul Ruiz (born 10 March 1988) is a Gibraltarian semi-professional footballer who currently plays for Bruno's Magpies in the Gibraltar National League as a central midfielder. On 10 October 2017, he made his debut for the Gibraltar national football team.

Club career
After leaving Lynx, Ruiz spent a season at Manchester 62. In a disappointing season for the club, Ruiz played a central role in midfield and was spotted by ambitious newly promoted side Mons Calpe in 2016. However, despite making 20 appearances in the league, he left the club as the MCSC ownership opted to overhaul their squad, joining Glacis United on 18 August 2017. He moved to Gibraltar Phoenix in January 2019, making his debut in a 2-0 defeat to former club Mons Calpe on 7 January 2019. However, in August 2019 he returned to the Calpeans.

Futsal career
Ruiz is also an active footballer in Gibraltar's futsal league, playing as a forward for Lynx futsal in their UEFA Futsal League campaigns.

References

Living people
Gibraltarian footballers
Gibraltar international footballers
F.C. Bruno's Magpies players
Gibraltar Phoenix F.C. players
Glacis United F.C. players
Manchester 62 F.C. players
Mons Calpe S.C. players
Lynx F.C. players
St Joseph's F.C. players
1988 births
Gibraltar Premier Division players
Association football midfielders